Greason is a surname. Notable people with the surname include:

A. LeRoy Greason (1922–2011), the twelfth president of Bowdoin College
Bill Greason (born 1924), retired American baseball player, became a Baptist minister
Jeff Greason, founder of XCOR Aerospace, the Commercial Spaceflight Federation
John Greason (1851–1889), American professional baseball player
Murray Greason (1901–1960), American college basketball and baseball coach
Staci Greason (born 1964), American actress
Thomas Greason (born 1970), Republican member of the Virginia House of Delegates